A stagecoach is a four-wheeled public transport coach used to carry paying passengers and light packages on journeys long enough to need a change of horses. It is strongly sprung and generally drawn by four horses although some versions are drawn by six horses.

Commonly used before steam-powered rail transport was available, a stagecoach made long scheduled trips using stage stations or posts where the stagecoach's horses would be replaced by fresh horses. The business of running stagecoaches or the act of journeying in them was known as staging.

Some familiar images of the stagecoach are that of a Royal Mail coach passing through a turnpike gate, a Dickensian passenger coach covered in snow pulling up at a coaching inn, a highwayman demanding a coach to "stand and deliver" and a Wells Fargo stagecoach arriving at or leaving a Wild West town. The yard of ale drinking glass is associated by legend with stagecoach drivers, though it was mainly used for drinking feats and special toasts.

Description
The stagecoach was a closed four-wheeled vehicle drawn by horses or hard-going mules. It was regularly used as a public conveyance on an established route usually to a regular schedule. Spent horses were replaced with fresh horses at stage stations, posts, or relays.
In addition to the stage driver or coachman who guided the vehicle, a shotgun messenger armed with a coach gun might travel as a guard beside him. Thus, the origin of the phrase "riding shotgun".
A simplified and lightened vehicle known as a stage wagon, mud-coach, or mud-wagon, was used in the United States under difficult conditions.  A canvas-topped wagon had a lower center of gravity, and it could not be loaded on the roof with heavy freight or passengers as an enclosed coach so often was. It was a similar style of passenger conveyance to the Berline coach.

Speed
With road improvements and the development of steel springs speeds increased.

History

Origins
The first crude depiction of a coach was in an English manuscript from the 13th century. The first recorded stagecoach route in Britain started in 1610 and ran from Edinburgh to Leith. This was followed by a steady proliferation of other routes around the island. By the mid 17th century, a basic stagecoach infrastructure had been put in place.  A string of coaching inns operated as stopping points for travellers on the route between London and Liverpool. The stagecoach would depart every Monday and Thursday and took roughly ten days to make the journey during the summer months. Stagecoaches also became widely adopted for travel in and around London by mid-century and generally travelled at a few miles per hour. Shakespeare's first plays were performed at coaching inns such as The George Inn, Southwark.

By the end of the 17th century stagecoach routes ran up and down the three main roads in England. The London-York route was advertised in 1698:

The novelty of this method of transport excited much controversy at the time. One pamphleteer denounced the stagecoach as a "great evil [...] mischievous to trade and destructive to the public health". Another writer, however, argued that:

The speed of travel remained constant until the mid-18th century. Reforms of the turnpike trusts, new methods of road building and the improved construction of coaches led to a sustained rise in the comfort and speed of the average journey - from an average journey length of 2 days for the Cambridge-London route in 1750 to a length of under 7 hours in 1820.

Robert Hooke helped in the construction of some of the first spring-suspended coaches in the 1660s and spoked wheels with iron rim brakes were introduced, improving the characteristics of the coach.

In 1754, a Manchester-based company began a new service called the "Flying Coach". It was advertised with the following announcement - "However incredible it may appear, this coach will actually (barring accidents) arrive in London in four days and a half after leaving Manchester." A similar service was begun from Liverpool three years later, using coaches with steel spring suspension. This coach took an unprecedented three days to reach London with an average speed of 
.

Royal Mail stagecoaches

Even more dramatic improvements were made by John Palmer at the British Post Office. The postal delivery service in Britain had existed in the same form for about 150 years—from its introduction in 1635, mounted carriers had ridden between "posts" where the postmaster would remove the letters for the local area before handing the remaining letters and any additions to the next rider. The riders were frequent targets for robbers, and the system was inefficient.

Palmer made much use of the "flying" stagecoach services between cities in the course of his business, and noted that it seemed far more efficient than the system of mail delivery then in operation. His travel from Bath to London took a single day to the mail's three days. It occurred to him that this stagecoach service could be developed into a national mail delivery service, so in 1782 he suggested to the Post Office in London that they take up the idea. He met resistance from officials who believed that the existing system could not be improved, but eventually the Chancellor of the Exchequer, William Pitt, allowed him to carry out an experimental run between Bristol and London. Under the old system the journey had taken up to 38 hours. The stagecoach, funded by Palmer, left Bristol at 4 pm on 2 August 1784 and arrived in London just 16 hours later.

Impressed by the trial run, Pitt authorised the creation of new routes. Within the month the service had been extended from London to Norwich, Nottingham, Liverpool and Manchester, and by the end of 1785 services to the following major towns and cities of England and Wales had also been linked: Leeds, Dover, Portsmouth, Poole, Exeter, Gloucester, Worcester, Holyhead and Carlisle. A service to Edinburgh was added the next year, and Palmer was rewarded by being made Surveyor and Comptroller General of the Post Office. By 1797 there were forty-two routes.

Improved coach design
The period from 1800 to 1830 saw great improvements in the design of coaches, most notably by John Besant in 1792 and 1795. His coach had a greatly improved turning capacity and braking system, and a novel feature that prevented the wheels from falling off while the coach was in motion. Besant, with his partner John Vidler, enjoyed a monopoly on the supply of stagecoaches  to the Royal Mail and a virtual monopoly on their upkeep and servicing for the following few decades.

Steel springs had been used in suspensions for vehicles since 1695. Coachbuilder Obadiah Elliott obtained a patent covering the use of elliptic springs - which were not his invention. His patent lasted 14 years delaying development because Elliott allowed no others to license and use his patent. Elliott mounted each wheel with two durable elliptic steel leaf springs on each side and the body of the carriage was fixed directly to the springs attached to the axles. After the expiry of his patent most British horse carriages were equipped with elliptic springs; wooden springs in the case of light one-horse vehicles to avoid taxation, and steel springs in larger vehicles.

Improved roads

Steady improvements in road construction were also made at this time, most importantly the widespread implementation of Macadam roads up and down the country. Each route had an average of four coaches operating on it at one time - two for both directions and a further two spares in case of a breakdown en route. Joseph Ballard described the stagecoach service between Manchester and Liverpool in 1815 as having price competition between coaches, with timely service and clean accommodations at inns.

Decline and evolution
The development of railways in the 1830s spelled the end for stagecoaches and mail coaches. The first rail delivery between Liverpool and Manchester took place on 11 November 1830. By the early 1840s most London-based coaches had been withdrawn from service.

Some stagecoaches remained in use for commercial or recreational purposes. They came to be known as road coaches and were used by their enterprising (or nostalgic) owners to provide scheduled passenger services where rail had not yet reached and also on certain routes at certain times of the year for the pleasure of an (often amateur) coachman and his daring passengers.

Competitive display and sport

While stagecoaches vanished as rail penetrated the countryside the 1860s did see the start of a coaching revival spurred on by the popularity of Four-in-hand driving as a sporting pursuit (the Four-In-Hand Driving Club was founded in 1856 and the Coaching Club in 1871).

New stagecoaches often known as Park Drags began to be built to order. Some owners would parade their vehicles and magnificently dressed passengers in fashionable locations. Other owners would take more enthusiastic suitably-dressed passengers and indulge in competitive driving. Very similar in design to stagecoaches their vehicles were lighter and sportier.

These owners were (often very expert) amateur gentlemen-coachmen, occasionally gentlewomen. A professional coachman might accompany them to avert disaster. Professionals called these vehicles 'butterflies'. They only appeared in summer.

Spread elsewhere

Australia
Cobb & Co was established in Melbourne in 1853 and grew to service Australia's mainland eastern states and South Australia.

Continental Europe

The diligence, a solidly built stagecoach with four or more horses, was the French vehicle for public conveyance with minor varieties in Germany such as the Stellwagen and Eilwagen. The diligence from Le Havre to Paris was described by a fastidious English visitor of 1803 with a thoroughness that distinguished it from its English contemporary, the stage coach.
A more uncouth clumsy machine can scarcely be imagined. In the front is a cabriolet fixed to the body of the coach, for the accommodation of three passengers, who are protected from the rain above, by the projecting roof of the coach, and in front by two heavy curtains of leather, well oiled, and smelling somewhat offensively, fastened to the roof.  The inside, which is capacious, and lofty, and will hold six people in great comfort is lined with leather padded, and surrounded with little pockets, in which travellers deposit their bread, snuff, night caps, and pocket handkerchiefs, which generally enjoy each others company, in the same delicate depository. From the roof depends a large net work which is generally crouded with hats, swords, and band boxes, the whole is convenient, and when all parties are seated and arranged, the accommodations are by no means unpleasant.

Upon the roof, on the outside, is the imperial, which is generally filled with six or seven persons more, and a heap of luggage, which latter also occupies the basket, and generally presents a pile, half as high again as the coach, which is secured by ropes and chains, tightened by a large iron windlass, which also constitutes another appendage of this moving mass. The body of the carriage rests upon large thongs of leather, fastened to heavy blocks of wood, instead of springs, and the whole is drawn by seven horses. 

The English visitor noted the small, sturdy Norman horses "running away with our cumbrous machine, at the rate of six or seven miles an hour". At this speed  stagecoaches could compete with canal boats, but they were rendered obsolete in Europe wherever the rail network expanded in the 19th century. Where the rail network did not reach, the diligence was not fully superseded until the arrival of the autobus.

In France, between 1765 and 1780, the turgotines, big mail coaches named for their originator, Louis XVI's economist minister Turgot, and improved roads, where a coach could travel at full gallop across levels, combined with more staging posts at shorter intervals, cut the time required to travel across the country sometimes by half.

New Zealand
A Cobb & Co (Australia) proprietor arrived in New Zealand on 4 October 1861, thus beginning Cobb & Co. (New Zealand) stagecoach operation.

United States

Beginning in the 18th century crude wagons began to be used to carry passengers between cities and towns, first within New England by 1744, then between New York and Philadelphia by 1756. Travel time was reduced on this later run from three days to two in 1766 with an improved coach called the Flying Machine. The first mail coaches appeared in the later 18th century carrying passengers and the mails, replacing the earlier post riders on the main roads. Coachmen carried letters, packages, and money, often transacting business or delivering messages for their customers. By 1829 Boston was the hub of 77 stagecoach lines; by 1832 there were 106. Coaches with iron or steel springs were uncomfortable and had short useful lives. Two men in  Concord, New Hampshire, developed what became a popular solution. They built their first Concord stagecoach in 1827 employing long leather straps under their stagecoaches which gave a swinging motion.

In his 1861 book Roughing It, Mark Twain described the Concord stage's ride as like "a cradle on wheels". Around twenty years later in 1880 John Pleasant Gray recorded after travelling from Tucson to Tombstone on J.D. Kinnear's mail and express line:  The horses were changed three times on the  trip, normally completed in 17 hours.

The stagecoach lines in the USA were operated by private companies. Their most profitable contracts were with U.S. Mail and were hotly contested. Pony Express, which began operations in 1860, is often called first fast mail service from the Missouri River to the Pacific Coast, but the Overland Mail Company began a twice-weekly mail service from Missouri to San Francisco in September 1858. Transcontinental stage-coaching ended with the completion of the transcontinental railroad in 1869.

Southern Africa
The railway network in South Africa was extended from Mafeking through Bechuanaland and reached Bulawayo in 1897.   Prior to its arrival, a network of stagecoach routes existed.

Ottoman Palestine

Stagecoaches, often known by the French name "Diligence" - a smaller model with room for six passengers and a bigger one for ten, drawn by two horses (in the city, on the plain or on a good road) or three (on intercity and elevated roads) - were the main means of public transportation in Ottoman Palestine between the middle of the 19th century and the beginning of the 20th century.

The first stagecoaches were brought to Palestine by the German religious group known as the "Templers" who operated a public transportation service between their colonies in the country as early as 1867. Stagecoach development in Palestine was greatly facilitated by the 1869 visit of Austrian Emperor Franz Joseph I. For this distinguished guest, the road between Jaffa and Jerusalem was greatly improved, making possible the passage of carriages. Stagecoaches were a great improvement over the earlier means of transport used in the country, such as riding horses, donkeys or camels, or light carts drawn by donkeys.

When the stagecoach ran into a difficult ascent or mud, the passengers were required to get off and help push the carriage. The trip between Jaffa and Jerusalem by stagecoach lasted about 14 hours spread over a day and a half, including a night stop at Bab al-Wad (Shaar HaGai), the trip in the opposite, downhill direction took 12 hours.

The stagecoaches belonged to private owners, and the wagoners were mostly hired, although sometimes the wagoner was also the owner of the wagon. The license to operate the stagecoaches was granted by the government to private individuals in the cities and to the colony committees in the early Zionist colonies.  The license holders paid a special tax for this right and could employ subcontractors and hired wagons.

The stagecoaches linked Jerusalem with Jaffa, Hebron and Nablus, the Zionist colonies with Jaffa, Haifa with Acre and Nazareth. They were also used for urban and suburban transportation in the Haifa region.

The colony of Rehovot is known to have promulgated detailed regulations for stagecoach operation, soon after its foundation in 1890, which were greatly extended in 1911. Fares were fixed, ranging between 1.10 Grush for traveling to the nearby village of Wadi Hanin and 5.00 Grush for traveling from Rehovot to Jaffa. The stagecoach was required to work six times a week (except for the Shabbat) and to carry free of charge the mails and medicines of the Rehovot pharmacy.

While railways started being constructed in Palestine in the last years of the 19th Century, stagecoaches were still a major means of public transport until the outbreak of The First World War, and in  peripheral areas were still used in the early years of British Mandatory rule.

In popular culture

Stories that prominently involve a stagecoach include:

 Winds of the Wasteland, a 1936 film starring John Wayne
 Wells Fargo, a 1937 film starring Joel McCrea
 Stagecoach, a 1939 film starring John Wayne
 Arizona Bound, a 1941 film starring Buck Jones
 Stagecoach to Denver, a 1946 film starring Allan Lane
 Black Bart, a 1948 film starring Dan Duryea
 A Ticket to Tomahawk, a 1950 musical comedy starring Dan Dailey in which stagecoach interests try to stop establishment of rail service.
 Riding Shotgun, a 1954 film starring Randolph Scott
 Dakota Incident, a 1956 film starring Dale Robertson
 Gunsight Ridge, a 1957 film starring Joel McCrea
 The Tall T, a 1957 film starring Randolph Scott
 Westbound, 1959 film starring Randolph Scott
 The Magnificent Seven, a 1960 film starring Yul Brynner
 Stage to Thunder Rock, a 1964 film starring Barry Sullivan
 Stagecoach, a 1966 film starring Bing Crosby
 Hombre, a 1967 film starring Paul Newman
 The Stagecoach, a 1968 comic book by Goscinny and Morris
 Dusty's Trail, a 1973 television series starring Bob Denver
 Five Mile Creek, a 1983-1985 television series featuring Nicole Kidman
 Stagecoach, a 1986 film starring Kris Kristofferson
 Maverick, a 1994 film starring Mel Gibson
 The Hateful Eight, a 2015 film by Quentin Tarantino

Part of the plot of Doctor Dolittle's Circus is set in a stagecoach, where the animal-loving Doctor Dolittle is traveling along with a female seal, disguised as a woman, whom he is helping to escape from the circus. The Doctor is mistaken for a notorious highwayman...

See also

 Carriage
 Celerity
 Charabanc
 Charley Parkhurst
 Coach (carriage)
 Cobb and Co
 Cobb & Co. (New Zealand)
 Horsebus
 Horse harness
 Jarbidge Stage Robbery
 Mail robbery
 Riding shotgun
 Roman traveling carriage
 Stage Coaches Act 1788
 Stage Coaches Act 1790
 Turnpike road
 Wagonette
 Wells Fargo & Co.
 Wickenburg Massacre

Notes

References

External links

United States
 Sherman & Smiths Railroad, Steam boat & Stage route map of New England, New-York, and Canada
 The Overland Trail:Stage Coach Vocabulary- Last Updated 19 April 1998 
 Stagecoach Westward - Frontier Travel, Expansion, United States
 Stagecoaches: TombstoneTimes.com 
 Felix Riesenberg, Jr., The Golden Road The Story Of Californias Spanish Mission Trail, Mcgraw-Hill Book Company, Inc., 1962
 Stagecoach History: Stage Lines to California
 Wild West Tales: Stories by R. Michael Wilson; Stagecoach
  Robert Glass Cleland, A history of California: the American period, The Macmillan Company, New York, 1922 Chapter XXIV, The Overland Mail and the Pony Express, pp. 359-368

United Kingdom
 The Stage Coaches of Britain. Anvil. Text based on Stagecoach by John Richards (1976).

Australia
 Cobb & Co Heritage Trail.

Coaches (carriage)
Wagons
Animal-powered vehicles
History of road transport
Horse transportation
Public transport
Western (genre) staples and terminology